KNPR (88.9 FM, "News 88.9") is a non-commercial radio station located in Las Vegas, Nevada. KNPR airs news/talk programming syndicated by National Public Radio (NPR). KNPR broadcasts in HD.

History 
KNPR signed on for the first time on March 24, 1980. Founded by Lamar Marchese, the station was the first NPR member in Nevada, originally airing NPR news and classical music at 89.5 FM. In 2003, KNPR moved to 88.9 and switched to NPR news and talk. Classical music moved to a new station, KCNV at 89.7.

KNPR also published the magazine Desert Companion.

Repeaters
 KWPR at 88.7 FM in Lund
 KLNR at 91.7 FM in Panaca
 KTPH at 91.7 FM in Tonopah
 KLKR at 89.3 FM in Elko

A sixth transmitter, KSGU at St. George, Utah, was sold to the Educational Media Foundation in 2020.

References

External links
Official Website

NPR
News and talk radio stations in the United States
NPR member stations
Radio stations established in 1980
1980 establishments in Nevada